An airboard is an inflatable bodyboard for the snow. It is a single-person sled.

References

Sledding
Sports equipment
Racing vehicles
Human-powered vehicles
Sliding vehicles
Snow